Al-Qa'im District is a district in Al Anbar Governorate, Iraq, on the border with Syria. It is centred on the town of Al-Qa'im. The Euphrates river flows through it. At its western end, in the city of Husaybah, is the Al-Qa'im border crossing to Abu Kamal in Syria's Deir ez-Zor Governorate.

Cities
 Al-Qa'im
 Al-Karābilah
 Al Ubaidi
 Al Ramanah

Districts of Al Anbar Governorate